Maria Cristina Damasco-Padolina (born 1946) is the current and seventh president and chief academic officer of Centro Escolar University in Manila, Philippines.

Career

In 1999 Padolina received the Most Distinguished Alumna Award given by the UP Alumni Engineers. Padolina is a member of the Advisory Group of the National Health Promotion Committee, and was on the executive board of the Asian Association of Open Universities from 1998 to 2001. She was appointed as the university's president and chief academic officer in September 2006, replacing the retiring . She led the university's centennial in 2007.

References

People from Ilocos Sur
Living people
Filipino educators
1946 births
University of the Philippines alumni
Ilocano people
Women heads of universities and colleges
Presidents of universities and colleges in the Philippines
Filipino women academics
Filipino academic administrators